Monteith Hall can refer to:
 Monteith Hall (Elyria, Ohio), on the National Register of Historic Places
 Monteith Hall, Virginia Tech campus

Architectural disambiguation pages